Platynus livens is a species of ground beetle native to Europe.

References

Platynus
Beetles described in 1810
Beetles of Europe